Nootdorp is a RandstadRail station located in Nootdorp, the Netherlands.

History
The RandstadRail station opened on 10 September 2006 for the RET Erasmuslijn metro service, currently line E. The station features 2 platforms, by a level crossing of the 's Gravenweg. These have platforms that are the same height as the train doors. 

Between 1908 and 1938 the station Nootdorp Oost was located here. 

In 2006 and 2007 the station was the terminus of all metro services, when they only operated Rotterdam Hofplein - Nootdorp. The station lies near the new housing area s-Gravenhout and the industrial estate Grote Driehoek''. 

Train services
The following services currently call at Nootdorp:

Bus services
These services depart from near the station:
Follow the cycle path southwards, over the Hofweg, walk about 200m.

 131 (Nootdorp Centrum - Nootdorp RR''' - Pijnacker Centrum RR - Pijnacker Gemeentekantoor (operated by Veolia Haaglanden)

Gallery

Railway stations opened in 2006
RandstadRail stations
Pijnacker-Nootdorp